Walter Boyd may refer to:
 Walter Boyd (footballer) (born 1972), retired football striker from Jamaica
 Walter Boyd (financier) (1754–1837), English financier
 Walter Douglas Boyd, Canadian cardiothoracic surgeon
 Sir Walter Boyd, 1st Baronet (1833–1918), of the Boyd baronets
 Sir Walter Herbert Boyd, 2nd Baronet (1867–1948) of the Boyd baronets
 Lead Belly (1888–1949), American folk and blues musician, who hid under the name Walter Boyd after escaping from prison
 Walter Boyd, the first candidate of the One New Zealand Party
 Walter Boyd (1796 ship), the East Indiaman Oosthuizen of the Dutch East India Company

See also
Boyd (surname)

Boyd, Walter